Gustav Ucicky  (6 July 1899 – 27 April 1961) was an Austrian film director, screenwriter, and cinematographer. He was one of the more successful directors in Austria and Germany from the 1930s through to the early 1960s. His work covered a wide variety of genres, but he is most acclaimed for his work in romantic drama and drama films.

Biography
Born in Vienna, Ucicky is often stated to have been the illegitimate son of painter Gustav Klimt for whom his mother Marie Učická from Prague worked and modeled, although this paternity is unconfirmed. He had begun an apprenticeship as a graphic designer, when he entered the film industry at the age of 17.

Selected filmography

References

External links 
 
 New York Times (dead link, no archived version in archive.org)

Austrian film directors
Austrian male screenwriters
Austrian cinematographers
Austrian film editors
Austrian people of Czech descent
Film people from Vienna
1899 births
1961 deaths
20th-century Austrian screenwriters
20th-century Austrian male writers
Klimt family